Mount Deeley is a mountain  high, on Pernik Peninsula, Loubet Coast in Graham Land, standing  northeast of Salmon Cove. It was mapped from air photos taken by the Falkland Islands and Dependencies Aerial Survey Expedition of 1956–57, and it was named by the UK Antarctic Place-Names Committee for Richard M. Deeley, a British geologist who made important investigations of the structure and flow of glaciers.

References

 SCAR Composite Gazetteer of Antarctica.

Mountains of Graham Land
Loubet Coast